Ratan Shastri was founder of Banasthali Vidyapith and a notable champion of women education.

She was a recipient of Padma Shri in 1955, Padma Bhushan in 1975, and Jamnalal Bajaj Award for outstanding contribution in the field of uplift and welfare of women and children in 1990.

She died in 1998 at the age of 86.

References

External links 

Indian women educational theorists
Recipients of the Padma Bhushan in social work
Recipients of the Padma Shri in literature & education
1998 deaths
People from Jaipur district
Rajasthani people
Founders of Indian schools and colleges
Year of birth missing
20th-century Indian educational theorists
Women educators from Rajasthan
Educators from Rajasthan
20th-century women educators
20th-century Indian women